Moralis is a Greek surname. Notable people with this surname include:
Yannis Moralis (born 1968), Greek mayor and Vice President of Olympiacos F.C.
Yiannis Moralis (1916-2009), Greek visual artist

Greek-language surnames